Colman mac Cathbaid is a sixth-century Irish saint who was an abbot and bishop of Kilroot (Co. Antrim), a minor see which was afterwards incorporated in the Diocese of Connor. He may have given his name to Kilmackevat (Co. Antrim).

In the Life of Mac Nise in the Codex Salmanticensis, the young Colman is saved from death by Bishop Mac Nisse of Connor, and instructed in the Holy Scriptures.

Colman was a disciple of St. Ailbe. At the direction of Ailbe, Colmán founded a church on the northern shore of Lough Laoigh. According to Bishop Healy, Colmán of Kilroot was the uncle of Colmán of Dromore.

Colman's feast has been kept on 16 October.

References

Medieval Irish saints
6th-century deaths
6th-century Christian saints
Medieval saints of Ulster
People from County Antrim
6th-century Irish bishops
Year of birth unknown